Waddinxveen is a town and municipality along the Gouwe river in the western Netherlands in the province of South Holland near Gouda.

A small piece of artwork named De Vergeten Plek (Dutch for 'The Forgotten Place') marks the lowest point on the Dutch polders, 7.01 meters below Amsterdam Ordnance Datum.

History
The first reference to the area is from 1233, when on April 20, Floris IV, Count of Holland, sold an area of peat lands along the Gouwe River for 200 Dutch pounds to Nicolas of Gnepwijk, Lord of Aalsmeer and Woubrecht. The area was given the name "Waddinxvene". Because of this event, Waddinxveen celebrated its 750-year anniversary in 1983.

Between 1817 and 1870, Waddinxveen was dissolved and its area split into the municipalities of Noord-Waddinxveen and Zuid-Waddinxveen. Due to further expanding, those two municipalities reunited into one.

Topography

Notable people
Tjark de Vries (born 1965), rower
Mark Vanderloo (born 1968), model
Pepijn van den Nieuwendijk (born 1970), painter and ceramist
Mirjam Overdam (born 1973), water polo player
Sharon den Adel (born 1974), songwriter, singer and fashion designer
Robert Westerholt (born 1975), musician and guitarist
Martijn Westerholt (born 1979), keyboardist and songwriter
Roald van Hout (born 1988), footballer

Gallery

References

External links 

 
Municipalities of South Holland
Populated places in South Holland